National Tertiary Route 308, or just Route 308 (or ) is a National Road Route of Costa Rica, located in the San José, Heredia provinces.

Description
In San José province the route covers Moravia canton (San Jerónimo district).

In Heredia province the route covers Santo Domingo canton (Paracito, Pará districts).

References

Highways in Costa Rica